Valentina  Polkhanova (Russian: Валентина Николаевна Полханова, born 15 August 1971 in Russia) is a Russian road racing cyclist. She won a gold medal at the UCI Road World Championships in the team time trial in 1993 and 1994 and a bronze medal in 1990 and 1991. In 1994 she also won the Tour de France Féminin.

References

External links
 

1971 births
Living people
Soviet female cyclists
Russian female cyclists
UCI Road World Champions (women)
Place of birth missing (living people)